Marcel Rodman (September 25, 1981) is a Slovenian former professional ice hockey forward.

Playing career
Rodman was drafted by the Boston Bruins of the National Hockey League (NHL) in 2001, but never played in the NHL.

He has played for the Krefeld Pinguine of the DEL, and the Graz 99ers, Vienna Capitals and HK Acroni Jesenice of the Austrian Hockey League.

On July 18, 2013, Rodman left SC Bietigheim-Bissingen of the 2nd Bundesliga and signed as a free agent to newly promoted DEL club, Schwenningen Wild Wings.

During the 2014–15 season, Rodman left KHL Medveščak Zagreb after only appearing in 9 scoreless games with the club. He returned to the EBEL, signing with EC KAC for the remainder of the season. In 21 games with KAC, Rodman brought stability and depth to the forward lines, scoring 11 points before suffering a season-ending injury preventing him from contributing in the playoffs in which KAC would claim the championship.

His younger brother David also played the sport professionally.

International play
He participated at several IIHF World Championships as a member of the Slovenia men's national ice hockey team.

Rodman played for the Slovenian national team at the 2008 IIHF World Championship, where he had 1 assist in 5 games.

Career statistics

Regular season and playoffs

International

References

External links

1981 births
Living people
Boston Bruins draft picks
Dresdner Eislöwen players
EC Bad Tölz players
Graz 99ers players
HK Acroni Jesenice players
Ice hockey players at the 2014 Winter Olympics
Ice hockey players at the 2018 Winter Olympics
KHL Medveščak Zagreb players
EC KAC players
Krefeld Pinguine players
Olympic ice hockey players of Slovenia
People from the Municipality of Žirovnica
Peterborough Petes (ice hockey) players
SC Bietigheim-Bissingen players
Schwenninger Wild Wings players
Slovenian expatriate sportspeople in Germany
Slovenian ice hockey right wingers
Vienna Capitals players
Slovenian expatriate sportspeople in Austria
Slovenian expatriate sportspeople in Croatia
Slovenian expatriate ice hockey people
Slovenian expatriate sportspeople in Canada
Expatriate ice hockey players in Canada
Expatriate ice hockey players in Austria
Expatriate ice hockey players in Germany
Expatriate ice hockey players in Croatia